Kells may refer to:

Places

Republic of Ireland
 Kells, County Kilkenny
 Kells Priory
 Kells, County Meath
 Abbey of Kells
 Kells (Parliament of Ireland constituency) until 1800

United Kingdom
 Kells, County Antrim, Northern Ireland
 Kells, Whitehaven, Cumbria, England
 Kells, Dumfries and Galloway, Scotland

Other uses
 Kells (band), a French band
 Kells (name), including a list of people with the name
 Kells A.R.L.F.C., an English rugby league club
 Tribal leaders of alien clans in the video game Destiny

See also
 
 Kell (disambiguation)
 The Book of Kells (disambiguation)
 Book of Kells, an illuminated manuscript Gospel book in Latin, c. 800 AD
 Kells railway station (disambiguation)
 Port Kells, British Columbia, Canada